Martineau Gardens is a community garden on Priory Road in Edgbaston, Birmingham, England. It adjoins the  Priory Hospital on Bristol Road. It features over two acres of woodland and formal gardens.
The Gardens are administered by a registered charity and are a member of the Federation of City Farms and Community Gardens.

Wildlife
The gardens are designated a Site of Local Importance for Nature Conservation (SLINC).

Awards
The Gardens have been awarded a Green Flag Award in 2010, 2011 and 2012, in recognition of being a well-kept 'green space'.

References

Gardens in the West Midlands (county)
Community gardening in England
Parks and open spaces in Birmingham, West Midlands
Sites of Special Scientific Interest in the West Midlands (county)
Edgbaston